The Cy Young Award is given annually to the best pitchers in Major League Baseball (MLB), one each for the American League (AL) and National League (NL). The award was first introduced in 1956 by Baseball Commissioner Ford Frick in honor of Hall of Fame pitcher Cy Young, who died in 1955. The award was originally given to the single best pitcher in the major leagues, but in 1967, after the retirement of Frick, the award was given to one pitcher in each league.

Each league's award is voted on by members of the Baseball Writers' Association of America, with one representative from each team. As of the 2010 season, each voter places a vote for first, second, third, fourth, and fifth place among the pitchers of each league. The formula used to calculate the final scores is a weighted sum of the votes. The pitcher with the highest score in each league wins the award. If two pitchers receive the same number of votes, the award is shared. From 1970 to 2009, writers voted for three pitchers, with the formula of five points for a first-place vote, three for a second-place vote and one for a third-place vote.  Before 1970, writers only voted for the best pitcher and used a formula of one point per vote.

History

The Cy Young Award was first introduced in 1956 by Commissioner of Baseball Ford C. Frick in honor of Hall of Fame pitcher Cy Young, who died in 1955. Originally given to the single best pitcher in the major leagues, the award changed its format over time. From 1956 to 1966, the award was given to one pitcher in Major League Baseball. After Frick retired in 1967, William Eckert became the new Commissioner of Baseball. Due to fan requests, Eckert announced that the Cy Young Award would be given out both in the American League and the National League. From 1956 to 1958, a pitcher was not allowed to win the award on more than one occasion; this rule was eliminated in 1959. After a tie in the 1969 voting for the Cy Young Award, the process was changed, in which each writer was to vote for three pitchers: the first-place vote received five points, the second-place vote received three points, and the third-place vote received one point.

The first recipient of the Cy Young Award was Don Newcombe of the Dodgers. In 1957, Warren Spahn became the first left-handed pitcher to win the award. In 1963, Sandy Koufax became the first pitcher to win the award in a unanimous vote; two years later he became the first multiple winner. In 1978, Gaylord Perry (age 40) became the oldest pitcher to receive the award, a record that stood until broken in 2004 by Roger Clemens (age 42). The youngest recipient was Dwight Gooden (age 20 in 1985).  In 2012, R. A. Dickey became the first knuckleball pitcher to win the award.

In 1974, Mike Marshall became the first relief pitcher to win the award. In 1992, Dennis Eckersley was the first modern closer (first player to be used almost exclusively in ninth-inning situations) to win the award, and since then only one other relief pitcher has won the award, Éric Gagné in 2003 (also a closer). A total of nine relief pitchers have won the Cy Young Award across both leagues.

Steve Carlton in 1982 became the first pitcher to win more than three Cy Young Awards, while Greg Maddux in 1994 became the first to win at least three in a row (and received a fourth straight the following year), a feat later repeated by Randy Johnson.

Winners

Major Leagues combined (1956–1966)

American League (1967–present)

National League (1967–present)

Multiple winners

Twenty-one (21) pitchers have won the award multiple times. Roger Clemens currently holds the record for the most awards won, with seven – his first and last wins separated by eighteen years. Greg Maddux (1992–1995) and Randy Johnson (1999–2002) share the record for the most consecutive awards won with four. Clemens, Johnson, Pedro Martínez, Gaylord Perry, Roy Halladay and Max Scherzer are the only pitchers to have won the award in both the American League and National League; Sandy Koufax is the only pitcher who won multiple awards during the period when only one award was presented for all of Major League Baseball. Roger Clemens was the youngest pitcher to win a second Cy Young Award, while Tim Lincecum is the youngest pitcher to do so in the National League and Clayton Kershaw is the youngest left-hander to do so.  Clayton Kershaw is the youngest pitcher to win a third Cy Young Award. Clemens is also the only pitcher to win the Cy Young Award with four different teams; nobody else has done so with more than two different teams. Justin Verlander has the most seasons separating his first (2011) and second (2019) Cy Young Awards.

Wins by teams
Only two teams have never had a pitcher win the Cy Young Award. The Brooklyn/Los Angeles Dodgers have won more than any other team with 12.

Unanimous winners
There have been 19 players who unanimously won the Cy Young Award, for a total of 26 wins.

Six of these unanimous wins were accompanied by a win of the Most Valuable Player award (marked with * below; ** denotes that the player's unanimous win was accompanied by a unanimous win of the MVP Award).

In the National League, 12 players have unanimously won the Cy Young Award, for a total of 15 wins.
Sandy Koufax (1963*, 1965, 1966)
Greg Maddux (1994, 1995)
Bob Gibson (1968*)
Steve Carlton (1972)
Rick Sutcliffe (1984)
Dwight Gooden (1985)
Orel Hershiser (1988)
Randy Johnson (2002)
Jake Peavy (2007)
Roy Halladay (2010)
Clayton Kershaw (2014*)
Sandy Alcántara (2022)

In the American League, seven players have unanimously won the Cy Young Award, for a total of 11 wins.
Denny McLain (1968**)
Ron Guidry (1978)
Roger Clemens (1986*, 1998)
Pedro Martínez (1999, 2000)
Johan Santana (2004, 2006)
Justin Verlander (2011*, 2022)
Shane Bieber (2020)

See also

Triple Crown (pitching)
Pitcher of the Month
Major League Baseball Reliever of the Year Award
 also known as the Mariano Rivera AL Reliever of the Year Award and Trevor Hoffman NL Reliever of the Year Award
"Esurance MLB Awards" Best Pitcher (in MLB)
Baseball Digest Pitcher of the Year (in MLB)
"Players Choice Awards" Outstanding Pitcher (in each league)
Sporting News Starting Pitcher (in each league)
"Greg Spira Memorial Internet Baseball Awards" Pitcher of the Year (in each league)
NLBM Wilbur "Bullet" Rogan Legacy Award ("Pitchers of the Year") (in each league)
Sporting News Relief Pitcher of the Year (in each league)
NLBM Hilton Smith Legacy Award ("Relievers of the Year") (in each league)
TSN Reliever of the Year (in each league) (discontinued)
Rolaids Relief Man Award (in each league) (discontinued)
Warren Spahn Award (best left-handed pitcher)
Major League Baseball All-Century Team
Major League Baseball All-Time Team
"Pitching Wall of Great Achievement" (in the Ted Williams Museum and Hitters Hall of Fame)
Eiji Sawamura Award (top starting pitcher in NPB)
Choi Dong-won Award (top starting pitcher in KBO)
Baseball awards

Notes
 The formula is: Score = 7F + 4S + 3T + 2FO + FI, where F is the number of first-place votes, S is second-place votes, T is third-place votes, FO is fourth-place votes and FI is fifth-place votes.
 See: Decision (baseball)
 In baseball, a save is credited to a pitcher who finishes a game for the winning team under certain prescribed circumstances. It became an official statistic in Major League Baseball in 1969.

References
Specific

General

 
 
 
 
 

1956 establishments in the United States
Awards established in 1956
Baseball pitching
Major League Baseball trophies and awards
Most valuable player awards